Eddie Lee Mays (March 15, 1929 – August 15, 1963) was the last person to be executed by the state of New York. He was convicted of first degree murder and robbery in 1962. Mays was 34 years old at the time of execution.

Early life
Mays was born in Walstonburg, North Carolina on March 15, 1929. Eddie was the youngest of five children, and his father abandoned the family for Baltimore, where he would go to prison for murder, when Eddie was 6 months old. Mays dropped out of school when he was 14 and spent the next several months working menial jobs in his home town. He later left for Baltimore, and first appeared on a police blotter in 1945. Mays was arrested for larceny, then assault for slashing his live-in girlfriend with a razor. After spending six months in jail, he returned to North Carolina. In 1951, Mays was fined $10 for assault after slashing a man during an argument. He returned to Baltimore a month later, but was re-arrested and sent back to North Carolina for killing a man. Mays pleaded guilty to manslaughter and served nearly seven years in prison before being released in 1958.

After his release, Mays went to New York City. There, he was convicted of felonious assault for slashing a man during an argument. Mays was given a three-year suspended sentence and his probation ended in January 1961.

Murder, trial, and execution 
On March 23, 1961, Mays and two accomplices, 34-year-old David Johnson and 30-year-old Jose Sanchez-Fernandez, held up the Friendly Tavern, at 1403 Fifth Avenue in East Harlem. Mays ordered the owner and the patrons to put their cash on the bar. However 31-year-old Maria Marini, who witnesses said was too slow to comply, enraged Mays. After opening her purse and finding it empty, Mays put a .38 caliber revolver to her forehead and pulled the trigger, killing her instantly. The gang stole a total of $275 from the bartender and several customers during the robbery.

In a 1988 interview with Manuel Guerriero, who defended Mays, he and other defense lawyers had convinced the prosecution to make an arrangement lowering his charge to second degree murder, which would have spared his life. However, Mays rejected the offer, saying he would prefer to be executed.

At Mays's subsequent trial, the court heard that he had been part of a gang which had committed 52 robberies in six weeks. He told reporters he would rather "fry" than spend his life in prison. After deliberating for 90 minutes, the jury found Mays guilty of first degree murder. They deliberated another 20 minutes before refusing to recommend mercy, resulting in Mays receiving a mandatory death sentence. One of the jurors in his trial was composer Robert Sour.

Johnson and Sanchez-Fernandez received life sentences. Johnson was paroled in 1976, and was working a job in the Bronx in 1983. Sanchez-Fernandez was paroled in 1977, but died of brain cancer a year later.

Mays entered the execution room at 10:01 p.m. on August 15, 1963, accompanied by a Protestant chaplain, and was strapped into the electric chair. He made no final statement to the prison warden or other witnesses before being electrocuted, and was pronounced dead three minutes later, at 10:04 p.m.

Mays would become the last person to be executed by "Old Sparky", New York state's electric chair at Sing Sing prison. The state electrician was Dow Hover. The electric chair had been the sole method of execution in the state since 1890 (hanging had been abolished in 1888). In 1965, the state of New York repealed the death penalty, except for cases involving the murder of a police officer. Although the legislature never fully repealed the death penalty statute, and the state even expanded it in 1995, there were no further executions because of rulings by Furman v. Georgia in 1972 at the Supreme Court and People v. LaValle in 2004 at the New York Court of Appeals.

See also 
 Capital punishment in New York (state)
 Capital punishment in the United States
 List of most recent executions by jurisdiction
 List of people executed in New York

References

External links
 New York Executions; retrieved November 12, 2007.
 NY Timeline. Death Penalty Information Center; retrieved November 12, 2007.
 A Look At The Last Man To Dine In The Empire State. Dead Man Eating; retrieved November 11, 2012. 
 Clyde Haberman. NYC; Life or Death? More Yawns Than Passion. The New York Times (May 29, 1998); retrieved November 12, 2007.

1929 births
1963 deaths
1961 murders in the United States
American people executed for murder
American people convicted of manslaughter
Executed African-American people
Executed people from North Carolina
20th-century executions by New York (state)
People executed by New York (state) by electric chair
20th-century executions of American people
People convicted of murder by New York (state)
20th-century African-American people